Eliseu Mendja Nadjack Soares Cassamá (born 6 February 1994) is a Bissau-Guinean professional footballer who plays for Swiss club Grasshopper Club Zürich as a right-back.

Club career

Early career
Born in Bissau, Guinea-Bissau, Cassamá started playing organised football in Portugal, his first youth team being G.D. Ribeirão. His senior debut was made in the third division, with G.D. Joane.

In summer 2014, Cassamá signed with Spanish club CF Reus Deportiu, quickly becoming first choice as well as a fan favourite. He contributed 17 games in his second season – play-offs included – helping the side reach Segunda División for the first time in their 107-year history.

Rio Ave
Cassamá returned to Portugal for the 2016–17 campaign, joining Rio Ave F.C. of the Primeira Liga on a five-year contract. He made his debut as a professional on 28 July 2016, playing the full 90 minutes in a 0–0 away draw against SK Slavia Prague in the last qualifying round of the UEFA Europa League. He also started in the second leg, being sent off for two yellow cards late into the first half as the match ended 1–1.

Cassamá missed the entire 2019–20, after suffering an injury to his right knee in training.

Grasshoppers
On 29 August 2020, Cassamá agreed to a one-year deal at Swiss Challenge League's Grasshopper Club Zürich. He played his first match on 18 September, providing one assist in a 3–2 win over FC Winterthur; he missed most of his debut season, however, due to a patellar tendon rupture ailment.

Cassamá started the following campaign with the reserve team in the 1. Liga in order to regain match fitness, returning to the main squad ahead of 2022–23. He made his Super League debut on 13 August, in a 2–2 draw at FC Sion.

International career
Cassamá earned one cap for the Portugal under-20 team, during a 2–0 friendly win over the Slovakia under-21s in February 2014. He made his debut for his native Guinea-Bissau on 22 March 2018, starting the 2–0 defeat to Burkina Faso in another exhibition game.

Manager Baciro Candé named Cassamá in the 23-man squad for the 2019 Africa Cup of Nations in Egypt. He played the opening 2–0 loss against Cameroon on 25 June, and was replaced by Nanu for the rest of the group-stage elimination.

References

External links

1994 births
Living people
Portuguese sportspeople of Bissau-Guinean descent
Sportspeople from Bissau
Bissau-Guinean footballers
Portuguese footballers
Association football defenders
Primeira Liga players
Campeonato de Portugal (league) players
G.D. Joane players
Rio Ave F.C. players
Segunda División B players
CF Reus Deportiu players
Swiss Super League players
Swiss Challenge League players
Grasshopper Club Zürich players
Portugal youth international footballers
Guinea-Bissau international footballers
2019 Africa Cup of Nations players
Bissau-Guinean expatriate footballers
Portuguese expatriate footballers
Expatriate footballers in Spain
Expatriate footballers in Switzerland
Portuguese expatriate sportspeople in Spain
Bissau-Guinean expatriate sportspeople in Switzerland